The Abercraf television relay station is sited on high ground to the east of the village of Abercraf in the upper Swansea Valley, though it is actually closer to Coelbren than to Abercraf itself. It was originally built in the 1980s as a fill-in relay for UHF analogue colour television covering the communities of Abercraf, Coelbren, Penycae and Ynyswen. It consists of a 45-metre (150 feet) self-supporting lattice mast standing on a hillside which is itself about 270 metres (890 feet) above sea level. The transmissions are beamed southwest and northwest. The Abercraf transmission station is owned and operated by Arqiva.

Abercraf transmitter re-radiates the signal received off-air from Carmel about 12 miles (20 km) to the west. When it came, the digital switchover process for Abercraf duplicated the timing at Carmel with the first stage taking place on 26 August 2009 and with the second stage being completed on 23 September 2009. After the switchover process, analogue channels had ceased broadcasting permanently and the Freeview digital TV services were radiated at an ERP of 18 W each.

Channels listed by frequency

Analogue television

1980s - 26 August 2009
Abercraf (being in Wales) transmitted the S4C variant of Channel 4.

Analogue and digital television

26 August 2009 - 23 September 2009
The UK's digital switchover commenced at Carmel (and therefore at Abercraf and all its other relays) on 26 August 2009. Analogue BBC Two Wales on channel 28 was first to close, and ITV Wales was moved from channel 25 to channel 28 for its last month of service. Channel 25 was replaced by the new digital BBC A mux which started up in 64-QAM and at full power (i.e. 25 W).

Digital television

23 September 2009 - present
The remaining analogue TV services were closed down and the digital multiplexes took over on the original analogue channels' frequencies.

References

External links
The Transmission Gallery: Abercraf 

Transmitter sites in Wales
Carmel UHF 625-line Transmitter Group